Abdallah Lahoucine (born 1935) is a Moroccan former cyclist. He competed in the individual road race and team time trial events at the 1960 Summer Olympics.

References

External links
 

1935 births
Living people
Moroccan male cyclists
Olympic cyclists of Morocco
Cyclists at the 1960 Summer Olympics